The Davenport railway station was first constructed in 1853 on the Ontario, Simcoe and Huron Railway, the first railway in Ontario, Canada.
The original building was replaced by a brick station in 1857.  It was located on Caledonia Park Road, just north of Davenport Road, in the former community of Davenport, a former satellite community of Toronto, Ontario that has long since been annexed into Toronto.

The station lay south of a scarp marking the ancient shoreline of glacial Lake Iroquois, and at the edge of the bay at the mouth of the Humber River.

It was demolished shortly after the construction of the St. Clair Avenue Station in 1932.

References

Railway stations in Toronto
Demolished buildings and structures in Toronto
Canadian Northern Railway stations in Ontario
Railway stations in Canada opened in 1853
1853 establishments in Ontario